Concord Mall is an enclosed shopping mall serving Elkhart, Indiana in the United States. It opened in 1972 and is anchored by JCPenney, and Hobby Lobby.

History
Concord Mall opened in August 1972, anchored by Montgomery Ward and Robertson's, a division of Gamble-Skogmo. J. C. Penney was added as a third anchor in 1976.  After Robertson's closed their location in 1985, Meis opened in the space later that year.  The Meis store was sold to Elder-Beerman in 1989, which was re-branded as Carson's in 2011. After Montgomery Ward closed, its building was split between Hobby Lobby (which opened in 2002) and ABC Warehouse. In 2008, a space vacated by Osco Drug was renovated into a food court. On January 31, 2018 Carson's parent company, Bon-Ton, announced they would be closing the Concord Mall location with 42 other stores. Then, they filed for bankruptcy and announced they would be closing all remaining locations.

In January 2023, JCPenney announced that they would be closing their Concord Mall location around May of 2023, which will leave Hobby Lobby as the only anchor left.

References

External links
Official website

Shopping malls in Indiana
Buildings and structures in Elkhart, Indiana
Shopping malls established in 1972